Francesco Daniel Celeste (born 3 May 1994) is an Argentine professional footballer who plays as a midfielder for Los Andes.

Career
Celeste started his career at Boca Juniors and had a spell on trial at Scottish club Rangers in 2012. He returned to Boca and made his professional debut with them on 1 December 2013, coming on as a substitute and playing the final 27 minutes in a 2–2 draw with Lanús in the Argentine Primera División. He joined LigaPro side Freamunde on loan for the 2015–16 season before returning to Argentina to join Quilmes and then later joined Mexican side Potros. On 29 August 2018, Celeste joined Serie C side Siracusa.

References

1994 births
Living people
Argentine footballers
Argentine expatriate footballers
People from Vicente López Partido
Boca Juniors footballers
S.C. Freamunde players
Quilmes Atlético Club footballers
Potros UAEM footballers
Siracusa Calcio players
C.S. Cartaginés players
Nueva Chicago footballers
Club Atlético Fénix players
Club Atlético Los Andes footballers
Argentine Primera División players
Liga Portugal 2 players
Ascenso MX players
Serie C players
Liga FPD players
Expatriate footballers in Portugal
Expatriate footballers in Mexico
Expatriate footballers in Italy
Expatriate footballers in Costa Rica
Argentine expatriate sportspeople in Portugal
Argentine expatriate sportspeople in Mexico
Argentine expatriate sportspeople in Italy
Argentine expatriate sportspeople in Costa Rica
Association football midfielders
Sportspeople from Buenos Aires Province